Mount Thiassi is a  mountain summit located in the Thiassi Range of the Coast Mountains, in southwestern British Columbia, Canada. It is the third-highest point in the Thiassi Range. Precipitation runoff from the peak and meltwater from unnamed glaciers on its slopes drain into tributaries of the Lillooet, Bridge, and Hurley Rivers. The first ascent of the mountain was made in 1965 by Dick Culbert and Alice Purdey. The mountain's name was submitted by this first ascent party to commemorate Thiassi, the god of storms according to Norse mythology. The name was officially adopted June 22, 1967, by the Geographical Names Board of Canada.

Climate
Based on the Köppen climate classification, Mount Thiassi is located in a subarctic climate zone of western North America. Most weather fronts originate in the Pacific Ocean, and travel east toward the Coast Mountains where they are forced upward by the range (Orographic lift), causing them to drop their moisture in the form of rain or snowfall. As a result, the Coast Mountains experience high precipitation, especially during the winter months in the form of snowfall. Winter temperatures can drop below −20 °C with wind chill factors below −30 °C. The months July through September offer the most favorable weather for climbing Thiassi.

See also

 Geography of British Columbia
 Geology of British Columbia

References

External links
 Weather forecast: Mount Thiassi

Two-thousanders of British Columbia
Pacific Ranges
Lillooet Land District